Novonagayevo (Yañı Nuğay) is a rural locality (a selo) and the administrative centre of Novonagayevsky Selsoviet, Krasnokamsky District, Bashkortostan, Russia. The population was 1,093 as of 2010. There are 17 streets.

Geography 
Novonagayevo is located 28 km south of Nikolo-Beryozovka (the district's administrative centre) by road. Novy Aktanyshbash is the nearest rural locality.

References 

Rural localities in Krasnokamsky District